Yarrabilba State Secondary College (YSSC) is a secondary school located in Yarrabilba, a locality of Logan City, Queensland, Australia. Construction was completed in 2019, and the school was opened for grades 7 and 8 in January 2020.

The school's first year 10 classes began in 2022. Social enterprise Substation33, which repurposes technology, donated computers and laptops to the school, some of which are used by a coding tutorial group.

References

External links

2020 establishments in Australia
Educational institutions established in 2020
Public high schools in Queensland
Schools in Logan City